What I Have Written is a 1996 Australian drama film directed by John Hughes and starring Martin Jacobs. It was entered into the 46th Berlin International Film Festival.

At the ARIA Music Awards of 1997 the soundtrack was nominated for Best Original Soundtrack, Cast or Show Album.

Cast
 Martin Jacobs as Christopher Houghton / Avery
 Gillian Jones as Frances Bourin / Catherine
 Jacek Koman as Jeremy Fliszar
 Angie Milliken as Sorel Atherton / Gillian
 Margaret Cameron as Clare Murnane
 Nick Lathouris as Claude Murnane
 Fiona Stewart as Meredith
 Julie Forsyth as Dr. Williams
 Bronwen Gault as Duty Nurse
 Libby Stone as Departmental Secretary
 Ian Scott as Alan Gough
 Jillian Murray as Janet Gough

References

External links

What I Have Written at Oz Movies

1996 films
Australian drama films
1990s English-language films
1996 drama films
1990s Australian films